Estádio Municipal Luiz Perissinotto, usually known as Estádio Luiz Perissinotto or, sometimes by its nicknames Bermudas and Municipal, is a multi-use stadium in Paulínia, Brazil. It is currently used mostly for football matches. The stadium has a capacity of 10,070 people. It was inaugurated on 2000 and extended in 2006.

The stadium is owned by the Paulínia City Hall, and it is the home stadium of Paulínia Futebol Clube.

References

Guia 2006 Brasileirão - Placar magazine

External links
Templos do Futebol
Federação Paulista de Futebol

Luis Peissinoto
Sports venues in São Paulo (state)
2000 establishments in Brazil
Sports venues completed in 2000